Omnidemptus is a monotypic genus of fungi in the family Magnaporthaceae containing the sole species Omnidemptus affinis.

References

External links 

Monotypic Sordariomycetes genera
Magnaporthales